The 2004 Nottingham Open, also known as The Nottingham Open presented by The Sunday Telegraph for sponsorship reasons,  was the 2004 edition of the Nottingham Open men's tennis tournament and played on outdoor grass courts. The tournament was part of the International Series of the 2004 ATP Tour. It was the 15th edition of the tournament and was held from 14 June through 19 June 2004. Paradorn Srichaphan won the singles title.

Finals

Singles

 Paradorn Srichaphan defeated  Thomas Johansson 1–6, 7–6(7–4), 6–3
 It was Srichaphan's 1st singles title of the year and the 5th and last of his career.

Doubles

 Paul Hanley /  Todd Woodbridge defeated  Rick Leach /  Brian MacPhie 6–4, 6–3

References

External links
 ITF – tournament edition details

Nottingham
Nottingham Open
2004 Nottingham Open